Machaven, also known as Hines House, is a historic home located at Rocky Mount, Nash County, North Carolina.  It was built in 1907–1908, and is a -story, Classical Revival style brick dwelling with  slate covered hipped roof. It has five interior chimneys, a pedimented portico with Doric order columns, and a full width one-story porch.  The interior finish is of the Colonial Revival style.

It was listed on the National Register of Historic Places in 1980.  It is located in the Villa Place Historic District.

References

Houses on the National Register of Historic Places in North Carolina
Colonial Revival architecture in North Carolina
Neoclassical architecture in North Carolina
Houses completed in 1908
Houses in Nash County, North Carolina
National Register of Historic Places in Nash County, North Carolina
Historic district contributing properties in North Carolina
1908 establishments in North Carolina